Richmond Township may refer to:

Canada
 Richmond Township, in Lennox and Addington County, Ontario

United States

Illinois
 Richmond Township, McHenry County, Illinois

Kansas
 Richmond Township, Franklin County, Kansas
 Richmond Township, Nemaha County, Kansas, in Nemaha County, Kansas

Michigan
 Richmond Township, Macomb County, Michigan
 Richmond Township, Marquette County, Michigan
 Richmond Township, Osceola County, Michigan

Minnesota
 Richmond Township, Winona County, Minnesota

Missouri
 Richmond Township, Howard County, Missouri
 Richmond Township, Ray County, Missouri

North Dakota
 Richmond Township, Burleigh County, North Dakota, in Burleigh County, North Dakota

Ohio
 Richmond Township, Ashtabula County, Ohio
 Richmond Township, Huron County, Ohio

Pennsylvania
 Richmond Township, Berks County, Pennsylvania
 Richmond Township, Crawford County, Pennsylvania
 Richmond Township, Tioga County, Pennsylvania

Township name disambiguation pages